Manoj Kumar Yadav  was an Indian politician. He was elected four times from Barhi constituency as a member of Indian National Congress. He was most senior politician in Indian National Congress but Yadav left the Indian National Congress and joined Bharatiya Janata Party in 2019 Jharkhand Legislative Assembly election as a candidate but lost.

References

Bihar MLAs 1995–2000
Living people
Bihari politicians
People from Hazaribagh district
Bihar MLAs 1990–1995
Jharkhand MLAs 2005–2009
Bihar MLAs 2000–2005
Jharkhand MLAs 2014–2019
Members of the Jharkhand Legislative Assembly
Year of birth missing (living people)